Robert Mandt Homme, C.M. (March 8, 1919 – May 2, 2000) was an American-Canadian television actor. Homme was best known as the host of The Friendly Giant, a popular children's television program that aired from the 1950s through the 1980s and was broadcast on CBC Television.

Background
Homme was born in Stoughton, Wisconsin into a Norwegian family. His parents were high school woodworking teachers, Raymond and Roselyn Homme. He attended elementary school at West Side School before attending Stoughton High School where graduated in 1937. He enrolled at the University of Wisconsin and graduated with a major in economics. He worked at a bank before joining the Air National Guard. His unit was activated in June 1941, prior to the attack on Pearl Harbor. He was soon promoted to Staff Sergeant, a rank he held for the duration of the war. One of his military assignments was to study psychology at Cornell University. He was later sent to study again at the University of Wisconsin. He finished the war processing and classifying discharging servicemen. Among the notable people he discharged was the actor and director, Captain John Huston.

Following graduation, Homme took a job with the University of Wisconsin State Radio Station WHA.

Homme was married to Esther Eleanor Anderson and had four children: Richard, Ann, Ruth and Peter. Richard was a Toronto-based jazz bassist who died on May 6, 2011.

Singer and voice actress Emilie-Claire Barlow is Homme's step-granddaughter.

Career

The Friendly Giant

While working at WHA radio, Homme would regularly drive from Madison to Chicago to watch rehearsals of a pioneering network television variety show called, The Dave Garroway Show. From these trips, Bob had developed an interest in programming. In 1953 as he was driving back from Chicago to Madison, he imagined creating a children's program. Bob recognized that giants were usually portrayed as frightening. It was his wife, Esther, who came up with the idea of a "friendly giant." Bob recognized that taking what is usually associated with a scary character and making it nice makes it doubly nice. Casper the Friendly Ghost is all the more friendly because that is not how ghosts are imagined. A friendly giant, therefore, becomes an even more friendly giant when compared to the Jack and the Beanstalk variety giant. Homme approached the program director of WHA radio, which was in the process of developing a television station. While continuing to work full-time on radio, he began developing the new children's television show.

The Friendly Giant began on WHA-TV in Madison on May 8, 1954. National Educational Television carried it in the United States from 1955 to 1968. Kinescopes of early episodes caught the attention of the Canadian Broadcasting Corporation, and production of the program moved to CBC Television's Toronto studios in 1958. CBC produced and aired The Friendly Giant until 1986, and it was later run in syndication on Canada's YTV.

The show was outlined but never scripted. Homme's dramatic style was minimalist. He recognized that television was a "hot medium" so that it was easy to exaggerate any actions or dialogue. Consistent with his personality, he tended to underplay his performances. This was in contrast to other high-energy early television programs such as Howdy Doody. Bob and his puppeteer partner (originally Ken Ohst in Wisconsin and then Rod Coneybeare in Canada) used the comfortable repartee of old radio programs Bob had enjoyed like, Vic and Sade, Burns and Allen, Bob and Ray, and the Easy Aces.

Television production innovation
One of his television production innovations was to change the perspective of the camera. Instead of the normal camera angles, raise the miniatures to camera height and place the human being as the unusual shot above the set. Suddenly, the person became the giant. Using a tight cover-shot and a loose close-up seemed to violate the newly established rules of television but it worked perfectly in creating the sense of a large giant. This countered the Godzilla effect where viewers watched a full-size monster walk around a miniature set. He always kept the giant character somewhere in the shot to emotionally reassure his preschool audience and to minimize any jarring effect.

Music
Growing up in a musical family, they enjoyed singing together and performing for the extended family each other on a Saturday night. Young Homme and his father had a little vaudeville act that was available when needed in the community. He later joined the school band at the University of Wisconsin. While Bob is best known for playing the recorder, his first instruments were the clarinet and the saxophone. He first purchased a recorder while stationed in New York City during his military service to give him an inexpensive and portable instrument during his travels. The recorder would become his signature instrument. On each episode of the show, he played three different recorders to match the pitch of each to the desired tone at that stage of the show.

Other

Bob Homme was the model in a number of paintings by his friend and Canadian artist, James Lumbers. Lumbers' "Moments in Time" paintings often featured images from the present together with a faded image of a person and things from the past at the same location. Homme's likeness was used in the images of grandfather types in these paintings such as "Lucky Strike" and "Gone Fishing." The Springer spaniel in "Old Friends" was the Homme's dog, Molly. In one painting of a honky-tonk piano player called "Billy Nine Fingers," Bob and Esther are one of the couples sitting at a table in the foreground.

Later life and retirement
Homme became a citizen of Canada in the early 1990s, holding both American and Canadian citizenships, and was invested into the Order of Canada as a Member on November 2, 1998, in Grafton, Ontario. As Homme was too ill to travel, the Governor General Roméo LeBlanc came to him (instead of making Homme come to Rideau Hall where the award is usually bestowed), thus allowing him the postnominal C.M.

Bob and Esther Homme retired to a rural property near Grafton, Ontario. In retirement, Bob joined the Cobourg Rotary Club and was active as a member. He and fellow Rotarian, Wally Reid formed a group, "Time Share." Together, they regularly performed music in area retirement and nursing homes.

Death
Homme died on May 2, 2000, of prostate cancer. He was 81 years old. He is buried at the Fairview Cemetery, Grafton, Northumberland, Ontario, Canada.

Biography
 Grant D. Fairley. (2010).The Friendly Giant: The Biography of Robert Homme. Toronto, Ontario: Silverwoods Publishing.

References

External links

1919 births
2000 deaths
20th-century Canadian male actors
20th-century American male actors
American emigrants to Canada
Canadian male television actors
Canadian people of Norwegian descent
Canadian children's television personalities
Canadian children's television presenters
American male television actors
American people of Norwegian descent
American children's television presenters
Deaths from cancer in Ontario
Deaths from prostate cancer
Members of the Order of Canada
People from Stoughton, Wisconsin
People from Northumberland County, Ontario
University of Wisconsin–Madison College of Letters and Science alumni